Radioskugga (lit. "Radio shadow") is a 1995 Swedish television series starring Figge Norling in the title role.

Plot summary 
Radio presenter Alexander is fired from his job at the urban Radio station. When he is offered a job at the new station Radio North Pole he moves to the small village Bakvattnet in northern Sweden only to learn that the potential audience is a mere fraction of what he is used to.

Cast 
Figge Norling as Alexander
Tomas Pontén as Johannes
Eva-Britt Strandberg as Gun
Gösta Bredefeldt as Oskar
Stina Rautelin as Talvi
Magnus Roosmann as Jonny
Daniel Götschenhjelm as Ragnar
Rebecka Hemse as Beata
Gunnar Nielsen as Father Berg
Karin Hagås as Camilla
And guest cast
Maud Adams as Nurse Katarina (1.2, 1.5, 1.7, 2.4, 2.6, 2.8)
Tova Magnusson-Norling as Jenny (1.1, 1.4)
Johan Widerberg as Niklas (1.4, 1.8)
Anna-Maria Blind as Elsa (1.3, 2.5)
Melinda Kinnaman as Vanja (1.7, 1.8, 2.8)
Mikael Persbrandt as Henry (1.5)
Anna-Lena Brundin as Mimmi (1.5)
Lena Nilsson as Ylva (1.5)
Rino Brezina as Gerhard Brezina (1.7)
Erik Ehn as Viktor (2.1)
Kalle Eriksson as Alexander 8 yrs (2.1)
Cecilia Nilsson as Solvej (2.2)
Bernt Ström as Driver (2.2)
Emma Norbeck as Ingrid (2.2, 2.8)
Ann-Sofie Rase as Maria (2.3)
Anders Nyström Big brother Jåns (2.3)
Ulf Isenborg Little brother Jåns (2.3)
Paula Brandt as Britta Jåns (2.3)
Staffan Göthe as The Wanderer (2.5)
Tomas Norström as Hans (2.6)
Linda Källgren as Ella (2.7 and undcredited 2.8)
Ann Petrén as Åsa Seger (2.8)
Robin af Ekenstam as Ingemar (2.8)
Mattias Quisth as Gustav (2,8)
Lasse Pierrou as Malte (2.8)

External links 
IMDb entry

Swedish drama television series
1995 Swedish television series debuts
1997 Swedish television series endings